Stacey Lauretta Dash (born January 20, 1967) is an American actress. Dash played Dionne Marie Davenport in the 1995 feature film Clueless and its television series of the same name. She has also appeared in the films Moving, Mo' Money, Renaissance Man, and View from the Top. Other television work by Dash includes appearances in the series CSI: Crime Scene Investigation, Single Ladies and the reality TV show Celebrity Circus. She has also appeared in music videos for Carl Thomas' "Emotional" and Kanye West's "All Falls Down".

Early life
Born in the Bronx borough of New York City, Dash is of African-American and Mexican descent. She is the daughter of Dennis Dash and Linda Dash (née Lopez; d. 2017). Dash has a stepfather, Cecil Holmes, and a younger brother, Darien Dash, who is the founder of DME Interactive, the first publicly traded African American-led website company. Her first cousin is Damon Dash, the former CEO and co-founder of Roc-A-Fella Records. She attended Paramus High School, graduating in 1985.

Career
Dash made her first television appearance in the NBC crime drama pilot Farrell: For the People starring Valerie Harper and Ed O'Neill in 1982, which did not make it past its pilot episode. Her first notable appearance was as Michelle in the 1985 The Cosby Show episode "Denise's Friend". Dash's first substantial television role was in the 1988 series TV 101. The series was canceled after 13 episodes. Dash's first major film role was in the Richard Pryor comedy Moving in 1988. She also had sizable roles in Mo' Money and Renaissance Man during this time. In 1995, Dash starred as a femme fatale in the low-budget film Illegal in Blue. Dash received her big break with the 1995 teen comedy film Clueless. Dash played Cher's high school best friend Dionne Davenport, although Dash was twenty-eight at the time. In 1996, the film spawned a television spin-off of the same name, in which Dash reprised her role as Dionne. The series ran from 1996 to 1999.

After the television series ended, she appeared in View from the Top (2003) and smaller budget films, including Gang of Roses (2003), and Getting Played (2005). She also has appeared in small guest roles on television shows such as Eve and CSI: Crime Scene Investigation. Dash played Vanessa Weir in the television series The Strip, which was canceled after several episodes. In 2001, Dash was featured in a music video by Carl Thomas for the single "Emotional". In 2004, Dash was featured in a music video by Kanye West, label signee of her cousin Damon Dash, for the single "All Falls Down". Dash posed nude in the August 2006 issue of Playboy. Also in 2006, she was featured in singer Marques Houston's video for "Favorite Girl," and launched her own lingerie line called Letters of Marque. Between 2005 and 2007, she completed filming roles in I Could Never Be Your Woman, Nora's Hair Salon II, Fashion Victim, Ghost Image and American Primitive. For 2008 release, she filmed Phantom Punch, Secrets of a Hollywood Nurse, and Close Quarters. Dash also performed in the 2008 reality television series Celebrity Circus. Prior to the series premiere, Dash suffered a broken rib while training. Despite the injury, Dash performed on the trapeze bungee during the premiere and continued on to be a finalist. Dash finished second behind Antonio Sabàto, Jr.

Dash appeared as a recurring character on the television series The Game in early 2009. In 2011, Dash starred in the first season of VH1's first scripted series, Single Ladies, playing Valerie "Val" Stokes, described as a "'good girl' looking for a good man". On August 31, it was reported that she would leave the series in order to focus on her family. In 2012, Dash starred as Lisa, the female lead in the film Dysfunctional Friends. Also in 2012, Dash was featured in Funny or Die and YouTube broadcast trailers and shorts for her web series Stacey Dash Is Normal. The scripted series launched in 2013.

On May 28, 2014, Fox News announced that Dash had been hired as a contributor for "cultural analysis and commentary." On the December 7, 2015 edition of Outnumbered, Dash made a remark about President Barack Obama's address regarding Islamic terrorism that took place the day before, suggesting the president didn't "give a shit" about terrorism. Due to this remark, the network suspended her without pay for two weeks. In 2016, Dash received criticism when she argued that the BET Awards lied to black people about news regarding the boycotting of the Oscars due to lack of ethnic diversity, and called for an end to Black History Month. She made a cameo at the 88th Academy Awards repeating this sentiment. In addition, she criticized Jesse Williams's speech at the BET Awards. On January 21, 2017, Fox News announced that Dash's contract would not be renewed.

Politics

Dash voted for Barack Obama in the 2008 U.S. presidential election. In 2012, she switched her party affiliation from Democratic to Republican and endorsed Republican presidential nominee Mitt Romney. In response to critical online comments she received for supporting Romney, Dash stated it was her opinion and that she did not understand the vitriol. Vice presidential candidate Paul Ryan thanked Dash for supporting his ticket.

Since the 2012 election, Dash has publicly expressed her political views. In April 2013, she criticized music artists Jay-Z and Beyoncé's trip to Cuba. In 2016, with regard to the debate over use of gender-specific bathrooms, she said that transgender rights "infringe upon [her own]". Dash writes a blog for Patheos.com. Dash supported Republican candidate Donald Trump in the 2016 presidential election.

On February 26, 2018, Dash filed to run in California's 44th congressional district in the 2018 Congressional Election as a Republican. On joining the race, Dash said she wanted to "free people from the shackles of a plantation mentality." Dash withdrew from the congressional race on March 30, 2018.

On March 11, 2021, Dash stated in an interview with Daily Mail, "Being a supporter of Trump has put me in some kind of box that I don't belong in. But he's not the president. I'm going to give the president that we have right now a chance."

Personal life

Relationships and children 
Dash has two children. She has a son named Austin, born from her relationship with singer Christopher Williams, and a daughter named Lola. She married producer Brian Lovell on July 16, 1999, and they divorced in the mid-2000s.<ref name="auto" / From 2005 to 2006, Dash was married to British executive James Maby, CEO of Sports Logistics. Different sources say the father of Dash's daughter is either Lovell or Maby. Dash married actor Emmanuel Xeureb in either 2007 or 2009. She filed for divorce in January 2010. It was finalized in September 2011. Dash married lawyer Jeffrey Marty in Florida on April 6, 2018. She has said that she met Marty ten days before the wedding. In addition to her two children, Dash became a step-mother to three of Marty's children. In April 2020, Dash announced that she and Marty had separated. In June 2020, Dash filed for divorce.

Trauma, drugs, weapons, and legal issues 
Dash has spoken openly about past traumas in her personal life. She has at various times revealed that she was molested as a child by a family friend, was addicted to cocaine in her teens and 20s, and has a history of being with physically and emotionally abusive partners. Dash has attributed her openness with such topics to her desire to be honest with her children, feeling that being honest is the best way to protect them, and to let them and others know that she is not a victim but a survivor. She is supportive of the right to keep and bear arms, crediting the use of a gun with saving her life after being sexually assaulted at gunpoint by an ex-boyfriend, because she was able to retrieve her own weapon, a .22 revolver, and shot at him, scaring him away.

Dash was arrested on September 29, 2019, at her apartment in Pasco County, Florida, on a domestic battery charge after an argument with her husband, Jeffrey Marty. She pleaded not guilty, and the case was dropped October 3 at the request of Marty, who said Dash had been arrested over his objection. The couple's divorce was announced the following year.

In October 2021, Dash opened up about her Vicodin addiction on The Dr. Oz Show, stating that she was five years sober.

Religion 
Dash was raised Catholic, and claimed the religion in 2012 and 2013.

Filmography

Film

Television

Music videos

Books

Notes

References

External links

 
 
 

1967 births
20th-century American actresses
21st-century American actresses
Actresses from Los Angeles
Actresses from New Jersey
Actresses from New York City
African-American actresses
American actresses of Mexican descent
American child actresses
American film actresses
American memoirists
American people of Barbadian descent
American television actresses
American voice actresses
Black conservatism in the United States
California Republicans
Entertainers from the Bronx
Hispanic and Latino American actresses
Living people
New Jersey Republicans
New York (state) Republicans
Paramus High School alumni
People from Paramus, New Jersey
American women memoirists
African-American Catholics
20th-century African-American women
20th-century African-American people
21st-century African-American women
21st-century African-American people
African-American child actresses